K R P Prabakaran (b 1979) is an Indian politician and Member of Parliament elected from Tamil Nadu. He is elected to the Lok Sabha from Tirunelveli constituency as an Anna Dravida Munnetra Kazhagam candidate in 2014 election.

He is a lawyer, and hails from Keezhapavoor in Alangulam taluk of Tirunelveli district(Now, Tenkasi district).

References 

All India Anna Dravida Munnetra Kazhagam politicians
Living people
India MPs 2014–2019
Lok Sabha members from Tamil Nadu
1979 births
People from Tirunelveli district